Punctoterebra plumbea, common name : the lead-coloured auger,  is a species of sea snail, a marine gastropod mollusk in the family Terebridae, the auger snails.

Description
The size of an adult shell varies between 13 mm and 25 mm.

Distribution
This species occurs in the tropical Indo-West Pacific and off the Philippines, Hawaii,  Papua New Guinea and the Solomons.

References

 Bratcher T. & Cernohorsky W.O. (1987). Living terebras of the world. A monograph of the recent Terebridae of the world. American Malacologists, Melbourne, Florida & Burlington, Massachusetts. 240pp
 Terryn Y. (2007). Terebridae: A Collectors Guide. Conchbooks & NaturalArt. 59pp + plates

External links
 Quoy J.R.C. & Gaimard J.P. (1832-1835). Voyage de découvertes de l'"Astrolabe" exécuté par ordre du Roi, pendant les années 1826-1829, sous le commandement de M. J. Dumont d'Urville. Zoologie. 1: i-l, 1-264; 2(1): 1-321 [1832]; 2(2): 321-686 [1833]; 3(1): 1-366 [1834]; 3(2): 367-954 [1835]; Atlas (Mollusques): pls 1-93 [1833]. Paris: Tastu
 Pease W. H. (1869). Description of new species of marine Gasteropodæ inhabiting Polynesia. American Journal of Conchology. 5: 64-79
 
 Fedosov, A. E.; Malcolm, G.; Terryn, Y.; Gorson, J.; Modica, M. V.; Holford, M.; Puillandre, N. (2020). Phylogenetic classification of the family Terebridae (Neogastropoda: Conoidea). Journal of Molluscan Studies

Terebridae
Gastropods described in 1833